Nicolaas "Nico" Jacobs (born January 26, 1981 in Pretoria, South Africa) is a retired amateur Namibian freestyle wrestler, who competed in the men's heavyweight category. Jacobs had claimed a bronze medal in the 96-kg division at the 2003 All-Africa Games in Abuja, Nigeria, and later became the first Namibian wrestler in history to compete at the 2004 Summer Olympics in Athens. A graduate at the University of Calgary in Canada, Jacobs trained for the university's wrestling team under his head coach Leigh Vierling.

Jacobs qualified for the Namibian squad, as the nation's first and lone wrestler, in the men's heavyweight class (96 kg) at the 2004 Summer Olympics in Athens, with a remarkable milestone. Earlier in the process, he placed sixth in the 97-kg division at the 2003 World Wrestling Championships in New York City, New York, United States, which automatically secured him a spot for his Olympic debut. He lost two straight matches each to Kazakhstan's Islam Bairamukov with a 1–7 decision, and Azerbaijan's Rustam Aghayev, who pinned him into the mat by both an eleven-point advantage and a technical fall, in the prelim pool, finishing eighteenth overall in the final rankings.

References

External links
 

1981 births
Living people
Namibian male sport wrestlers
Olympic wrestlers of Namibia
Wrestlers at the 2004 Summer Olympics
Sportspeople from Pretoria
University of Calgary alumni
Wrestlers at the 2002 Commonwealth Games
Commonwealth Games competitors for Namibia
African Games bronze medalists for Namibia
African Games medalists in wrestling
Competitors at the 2003 All-Africa Games
20th-century Namibian people
21st-century Namibian people